Hutto is a city in Williamson County, Texas, United States. It is part of the Austin–Round Rock metropolitan area. The population was 27,577 at the 2020 census.

History

Hutto was established in 1876 when the International-Great Northern Railroad passed through land owned by James Emory Hutto (1824–1914), for whom the community is named. Railroad officials designated the stop Hutto Station. James Hutto was born in Alabama on June 8, 1824; he came to Texas in 1847 and moved his family to Williamson County in 1855. A slave, Adam Orgain, was actually the first person to live in the immediate Hutto vicinity, having been placed out on the blackland prairie by his owner to watch after the cattle and livestock holdings. In 1876, James Hutto sold  to the Texas Land Company of New York for a town site and railroad right of way. Hutto became a wealthy cattleman in Williamson County, but in 1885, he left Hutto for Waco, and entered the hardware business. Other early settlers in the area were the Carpenter, Davis, Evans, Farley, Goodwin, Highsmith, Johnson, Magle, Payne, Saul, Weight, Womack, and Wright families. Other people living in Hutto during the 1890s included the Armstrongs, the Ahlbergs, M. B. Kennedy, the Hugh Kimbro family, William McCutcheon, Green Randolph, J. B. Ross and the Tisdales. Soon, a great many more people, primarily Swedish and German immigrants, came to the area to farm and ranch and begin their new lives in America.

Geography

According to the United States Census Bureau, the city has a total area of 7.75 square miles (20.1 km2), all of it land.

Demographics

As of the 2020 United States census, 27,577 people, 8,106 households, and 6,219 families were residing in the city. The population density was 1,896.5 people per square mile (3,052.1/km2). The 4,917 housing units averaged 634.5 per square mile (1,021.1/km2).

In 2000, of the 398 households, 52.3% had children under 18 living with them, 61.8% were married couples living together, 11.6% had a female householder with no husband present, and 20.1% were not families. About 15.6% of all households were made up of individuals, and 5.5% had someone living alone who was 65 years of age or older. The average household size was 3.14 and the average family size was 3.48.

In the city, the population was distributed as 35.0% under 18, 7.4% from 18 to 24, 37.0% from 25 to 44, 13.6% from 45 to 64, and 7.0% who were 65 or older. The median age was 29 years. For every 100 females, there were 99.7 males. For every 100 females age 18 and over, there were 97.1 males.

Males had a median income of $33,125 versus $28,125 for females. The per capita income for the city was $20,113. About 3.8% of families and 4.6% of the population were below the poverty line, including 3.9% of those under age 18 and 2.0% of those age 65 or over.

Education

Hutto is served by the Hutto Independent School District.

Public schools
 Hutto High School
 Hutto Ninth Grade Center
 Hutto Middle School
 Farley Middle School
 Cottonwood Creek Elementary
 Hutto Elementary
 Nadine Johnson Elementary
 Ray Elementary
 Legacy Early College High School
 Veterans Hill Elementary
 Howard Norman Elementary
 Kerley Elementary

Higher education
Hutto is home to the Eastern Williamson County Higher Education Center, which is a partnership between Temple Junior College, Texas A&M University-Central Texas, and Texas State Technical College.

References

External links

 Official website
 Chamber of commerce
 

Cities in Texas
Cities in Williamson County, Texas
Greater Austin
Populated places established in 1876